Summerford may refer to:

 Summerford, Newfoundland and Labrador, Canada
 Summerford, Ohio, United States
 Walter Summerford, a man alleged to have been struck by lightning four times, including in his grave.
 Glenn Summerford, a snake handling preacher convicted of attempted murder, described in the 1998 non-fiction book Salvation on Sand Mountain

See also
Somerford (disambiguation)